Máirín Ní Ghadhra, Irish broadcaster and writer.

A graduate of National University of Ireland, Galway, Ní Ghadhra has worked with RTÉ Raidió na Gaeltachta since the 1980s, firstly as a continuity announcer and latterly in the news department. She presents Nuacht a hAon on RTÉ Raidió na Gaeltachta. Her children's books are published by  Cló Iar-Chonnacht.

She is a mother to two children and now lives in Carraroe, County Galway.

She was born in Furbo, in Connemara on 30 May 1971.

Bibliography
 Taibhse an Dá Thaobh
 Lámh Mharbh Abú!
 An Cúigear Cróga (The Famous Five): A Lazy Afternoon
 Horrid Henry Dónall Dána The Full Set, with Gormfhlaith Ní Thuairisg and Marion Ní Shúilleabháin

External links
 https://presspack.rte.ie/2016/10/01/an-tseachtain-le-mairin-ni-ghadhra-16/
 https://www.cic.ie/en/browseby/mairin-ui-ghadhra
 https://www.cic.ie/en/books/published-books/horrid-henry-donall-dana-an-seit-ar-fad
 https://twitter.com/mairinnighadhra

Living people
20th-century Irish people
21st-century Irish people
People from County Galway
Irish-language writers
Irish fantasy writers
Irish women radio presenters
Irish children's writers
Irish women children's writers
RTÉ Raidió na Gaeltachta presenters
Year of birth missing (living people)